is a district located in Sōya Subprefecture, Hokkaido, Japan.  The district consists of Rishiri Island, in the Sea of Japan to the west of the northern tip of Hokkaido.

As of 2004, the district has an estimated population of 5,525 and a density of 30.33 persons per km2. The total area is 182.18 km2.

Rishiri Airport is located in Rishirifuji.

Towns and villages
Rishiri
Rishirifuji

Districts in Hokkaido